Siem Reap International Airport  is an international airport serving Siem Reap, a popular tourist destination due to the nearby Angkor Wat temple complex. It is the second-busiest airport in Cambodia after Phnom Penh International Airport.

Facilities

The airport's new terminal was inaugurated on 28 August 2006. The Cambodian government has plans to replace the airport with a new one, 60 km from Siem Reap. As of 2008, extensions to the airport's apron and parking areas are taking place. Air Traffic Control is provided by CATS (Cambodia Air Traffic Services), with full approach and aerodrome VHF facilities being housed in the control tower, between the fire station and the domestic terminal. Area control is provided from CATS Centre in Phnom Penh (Pochentong) VHF frequencies used at Siem Reap are:
Tower: 118.300 MHz (AM)
Approach: 124.300 MHz (AM)
ACC1 (FIR): 127.500 MHz Backup 134.100 MHz(AM)
ACC2 (FIR): 132.400 MHz Backup 135.150 (AM) implement 15/November/2019 
Ground (apron): 121.750 MHz (AM)
ATIS (WX): 129.950 MHz (AM)
D-ATIS (WX): 131.450 MHZ (AM) 
Tower – fire 3A: 143.750 MHz (FM)

CATS are also responsible for clearing takeoffs and landings of tourist helicopters from the “Big Balloon” site, 3 km away, near Angkor Wat. Both Helicopters Cambodia and Sokha Helicopters operate from the airport, with Sokha mainly operating from the Big Yellow Balloon site. The airport itself is located some 6 km outside Siem Reap, just off National Route 6 north. Runway alignments are 23 & 05, with only 23 being used for takeoff, due to flight restrictions over Angkor temple.

Airfield
Parallel taxiway: length:  width:  and 10 metres of shoulders. Under construction: 1 (length: 600 metres, width: 25 metres and 15 metres of shoulders).
Number of stands: 10

Future
New Siem Reap–Angkor International Airport

It is being built in three phases. The first phase is scheduled to be finished in October 2023, and will be able to handle 5—7 million passengers annually. Once the new airport is open the old airport will be closed permanently.

Airlines and destinations

Statistics

Accidents and incidents
In August 2002, a Bangkok Airways ATR 72-200 skidded off the runway. The airport was closed for two days.

See also
Battambang Airport
Kampong Cham Airport
Phnom Penh International Airport
List of airports in Cambodia

References

External links

Siem Reap International Airport at Cambodia International Airports website

Airports in Cambodia
Buildings and structures in Siem Reap